Bonnie Gritton is an American classical pianist.

As well as performing in concert, she teaches piano performance and pedagogy at the University of Utah.  Dr. Gritton made her debut performance at age 15, when she played Beethoven’s Emperor Concerto, accompanied by the Utah Symphony Orchestra. She has performed in concerts in Europe, Israel, and the U.S.  Recent tours have taken her to Greece, Spain and Hawaii.

Dr. Gritton's concert performances are often piano duets with her University of Utah colleague, Professor Susan Duelhmeir. Together they have released a CD of the music of Gershwin on the Centaur label and a recording of the Wolking Jazz Two-Piano Concerto with the Warsaw Philharmonic Orchestra.

Gritton received her Master's and the Ph.D. in musicology from the University of California at Los Angeles, studying under Aube Tzerko, Rosina Lhévinne, Igor Kipnis and Lola Odiaga. She also studied the pedagogical and critical works of Friedrich Wieck, who was Robert Schumann's music teacher and father-in-law. Wieck's musical writings formed the subject of Dr. Gritton's Ph.D. dissertation.

References

External links
Website
Duehlmeier-Gritton Duo Website
Salt Lake Symphony Biography
University of Utah Biography

American classical pianists
American women classical pianists
University of Utah faculty
UCLA Herb Alpert School of Music alumni
Living people
Year of birth missing (living people)
Place of birth missing (living people)
21st-century classical pianists
21st-century American women pianists
21st-century American pianists
American women academics